Kevin Carroll (born June 17, 1969) from Hempstead, Texas is a former American football defensive lineman who played eight seasons in the Arena Football League with the Cincinnati Rockers, Las Vegas Sting/Anaheim Piranhas, Grand Rapids Rampage and Los Angeles Avengers. He played college football at Knoxville College. He was also a member of the Toronto Argonauts of the Canadian Football League.

References

External links
Just Sports Stats

Living people
1969 births
Players of American football from Texas
American football defensive linemen
Canadian football defensive linemen
African-American players of American football
African-American players of Canadian football
Place of birth missing (living people)
Knoxville Bulldogs football players
Cincinnati Rockers players
Toronto Argonauts players
Las Vegas Sting players
Anaheim Piranhas players
Grand Rapids Rampage players
Los Angeles Avengers players
People from Hempstead, Texas
21st-century African-American people
20th-century African-American sportspeople